The North Worcestershire Path is a waymarked long-distance trail within the historic county of Worcestershire in England. It runs  from Bewdley to Major's Green, Birmingham.

The route

The North Worcestershire Path begins at the Georgian town of Bewdley, also the starting point for the Worcestershire Way. Running north along the River Severn to Eymore Wood near to the Trimpley Reservoirs, the route then heads east to Kingsford Country Park and Kinver Edge near the Staffordshire Way, before continuing east towards the Clent Hills. From the Clent Hills the route goes south to the densely wooded Lickey Hills, where it winds up through Scots Pine and native woodland past a visitor's centre.   From the Lickey Hills the route winds roughly northeast, finishing in Major's Green.

References

External links
Info from Worcestershire County Council
Info from the Rambler's Association

Long-distance footpaths in England
Footpaths in Worcestershire